Mid Sussex is an area in the central part of Sussex. It may refer to:

 Mid Sussex District, a local government district in West Sussex
 Mid Sussex (UK Parliament constituency)
 Mid Sussex Football League
 Mid Sussex Times, a local newspaper
 Arun Valley line, also called the Mid Sussex line, a rail line in West Sussex
 More Radio Mid-Sussex, a local radio station
 Brighton & Mid-Sussex, a proposed local government district in the Redcliffe-Maud Report